Go Se-tae (1925 – 22 April 1986) was a South Korean basketball player who competed in the 1956 Summer Olympics. He graduated from Kaesong Songdo Middle School, and went on to attend Korea University. In 1952 he was in military service and played for the Military Manpower Administration basketball team. He later played for the Korea Development Bank team. After his appearance at the Olympics, he became a director of the Korea Basketball Association, and was one of the few directors who did not join the mass resignation after the South Korean team's poor performance at the 1964 Summer Olympics. He died at his home in Hyochang-dong, Yongsan District, Seoul on the morning of 22 April 1986.

Notes

References

1925 births
1986 deaths
South Korean men's basketball players
Olympic basketball players of South Korea
Basketball players at the 1956 Summer Olympics
Korea University alumni